Zachary Ryan Davies (born February 7, 1993) is an American professional baseball pitcher for the Arizona Diamondbacks of Major League Baseball (MLB). He has previously played in MLB for the Milwaukee Brewers, San Diego Padres, and Chicago Cubs.

The Baltimore Orioles selected Davies in the 26th round of the 2011 MLB draft. Davies appeared in the All-Star Futures Game in 2015, and later that year was traded to the Brewers. He made his MLB debut for Milwaukee in 2015, and was traded to the Padres after the 2019 season. The Padres traded Davies to the Cubs after the 2020 season.

Amateur career
Davies grew up near Seattle before moving to Arizona when he was seven, where he attended Mesquite High School, in Gilbert, Arizona. He played for the school's baseball team initially as a middle infielder, becoming a pitcher in his junior year.

Professional career

Baltimore Orioles
The Baltimore Orioles selected Davies in the 26th round of the 2011 MLB draft. Davies signed with the Orioles, forgoing his commitment to Arizona State University for a $575,000 signing bonus.

Davies made his professional debut with the Delmarva Shorebirds of the Class A South Atlantic League in 2012, where he pitched to a 3.86 earned run average (ERA). He had a 3.69 ERA for the Frederick Keys of the Class A-Advanced Carolina League in 2013. In 2014, he pitched for the Bowie Baysox of the Class AA Eastern League. For Bowie, Davies pitched to a 3.35 ERA. He represented the Orioles in the Arizona Fall League after the regular season. Davies began the 2015 season with the Norfolk Tides of the Class AAA International League, and was chosen to represent the Orioles at the 2015 All-Star Futures Game. With Norfolk, Davies pitched to a 2.84 ERA in 19 games.

Milwaukee Brewers
On July 31, 2015, the Orioles traded Davies to the Milwaukee Brewers for Gerardo Parra. The Brewers assigned Davies to the Colorado Springs Sky Sox of the Class AAA Pacific Coast League, with whom he was 1–2 with a 5.00 ERA, and promoted him to make his major league debut on September 2. In 2016 with Milwaukee, Davies pitched to a 3.97 ERA in 28 games. In 2017, Davies carried a 3.90 ERA in 33 games.

In 2018, Davies pitched in 13 games for the Brewers, and was 2–7 with a 4.77 ERA, as with three minor league teams he was 2–4 with a 4.40 ERA. In 2019, Davies had a 3.55 ERA in 31 games for Milwaukee.

San Diego Padres
On November 27, 2019, the Brewers traded Davies, Trent Grisham, and cash considerations or a player to be named later to the San Diego Padres in exchange for Luis Urías and Eric Lauer.

In 2020, Davies was 7–4 with a 2.73 ERA. He tied Max Fried in wins for second-most in the NL, behind the 8 wins of league leader Yu Darvish.

Chicago Cubs
On December 29, 2020, the Padres traded Davies, Owen Caissie, Reginald Preciado, Yeison Santana, and Ismael Mena to the Chicago Cubs in exchange for pitcher Yu Darvish and catcher Víctor Caratini. On June 24, 2021, Davies pitched a combined no-hitter against the Los Angeles Dodgers along with Ryan Tepera, Andrew Chafin, and Craig Kimbrel. He was named a finalist for the 2021 NL Gold Glove Award at pitcher, but it was won by Max Fried. Davies elected free agency following the season.

Arizona Diamondbacks
On March 24, 2022, Davies signed a one-year, $1.75 million contract with a mutual option with the Arizona Diamondbacks.

On January 11, 2023, Davies re-signed with the Diamondbacks on a one-year, $5 million contract.

Personal life
Davies married longtime girlfriend Megan White on December 3, 2016. They were divorced on May 16, 2022, with his wife citing in an Instagram post her husband's alleged affair as one of the main reasons.

References

External links

1993 births
Living people
Sportspeople from Puyallup, Washington
Sportspeople from Chandler, Arizona
Baseball players from Arizona
Major League Baseball pitchers
Milwaukee Brewers players
San Diego Padres players
Chicago Cubs players
Arizona Diamondbacks players
Delmarva Shorebirds players
Frederick Keys players
Bowie Baysox players
Glendale Desert Dogs players
Norfolk Tides players
Colorado Springs Sky Sox players